Intercity passenger transport is a part of Public Company Ljubljana Passenger Transport (LPP), which provides intercity and tourist passenger transport. Between 2009 and 2012 the service was excluded from LPP and operated under the name of BUS as its subsidiary. Before, intercity bus service was excluded from LPP and it operated under the name of suburban passenger transport.

Since 2013, Urbana is used to pay for services on intercity buses.

Table of regular bus routes 

Legend:
 S -> operates on weekdays during school year
 * -> route 64 is operated by Alpetour and LPP

Regional tags

History 
Most of bus lines were cancelled after 1997 due to drastic decrease of passengers and unrentability. In last several years the reason behind the cancellation of bus lines was the extension of city bus routes to the suburban areas.

Ljubljana Passenger Transport